Brent Danem Mayne (born April 19, 1968) is an American former professional baseball catcher. He played 15 seasons in Major League Baseball (MLB) from 1990 to 2004 for the Kansas City Royals, New York Mets, Oakland Athletics, San Francisco Giants, Colorado Rockies, Arizona Diamondbacks, and Los Angeles Dodgers.

Career
Mayne was an All-American at Cal State Fullerton,  and inducted into the Orange Coast College Hall of Fame in 2006. He was drafted in the first round of the 1989 Major League Baseball (MLB) Draft, 13th overall.
Brent Mayne was a major league catcher from 1990 to 2004.  He played most of his career with the Kansas City Royals but also spent time with the Mets, A's, Giants, Rockies, Diamondbacks, and Dodgers.  He ranks 75th in the history of baseball with 1,143 pro games caught, and held the distinction of being the only catcher in the twentieth century to have won a game as a pitcher, until Cubs backup catcher John Baker won a game as a relief pitcher on July 29, 2014.  Through his career, the well traveled Mayne was an effective catcher and an excellent handler of pitchers.  He blocked the plate well and had a strong arm.  Mayne was a decent hitter with occasional power and compiled a career high .301 batting average in consecutive seasons (1999–2000).  In retirement, Mayne has gone on to serve on the board of directors of the Braille Institute and the Center for Hope and Healing.  He is also the author of a book titled "The Art of Catching" and creator of a website and blog www.brentmayne.com.

As a Royal, Mayne caught Bret Saberhagen's no-hitter on August 26, 1991.

On August 22, 2000, the Colorado Rockies sent Mayne in as a relief pitcher in the 12th inning against the Atlanta Braves. Mayne, the Rockies' regular catcher, was unable to swing a bat due to a sprained left wrist and had missed the previous four games. Out of pitchers, manager Buddy Bell asked Mayne if he could pitch. Mayne, who later said he had never pitched at any level, responded, "Yeah, I can pitch." He pitched one inning, surrendering no runs with a fastball that topped out at 83 miles per hour. Colorado won the game in the bottom of the 12th inning when rookie Adam Melhuse, pinch-hitting for Mayne, singled with the bases loaded and two outs.

In a 15-year career, Mayne was a .263 hitter with 38 home runs and 403 RBI in 1279 games.

References

External links
 Baseball Library (highlights) Brent Mayne | BaseballLibrary.com

  The Were-Pitcher and Other Tales of Mound Madness
  The 100 Greatest Royals of All-Time, #56 Brent Mayne

1968 births
Living people
American expatriate baseball players in Canada
Arizona Diamondbacks players
Baseball City Royals players
Baseball players from California
Cal State Fullerton Titans baseball players
Colorado Rockies players
Edmonton Trappers players
Kansas City Royals players
Los Angeles Dodgers players
Los Angeles Dodgers scouts
Major League Baseball catchers
Memphis Chicks players
New York Mets players
Oakland Athletics players
People from Loma Linda, California
San Diego Padres scouts
San Francisco Giants players
Tucson Sidewinders players
Wichita Wranglers players
Alaska Goldpanners of Fairbanks players